FC Montreux-Sports is a professional football club based in Montreux, Switzerland. They are currently playing in the regional division, the fifth level on the Swiss Football League.

External links
Official Website

Montreux-Sports, FC
Sport in Montreux
1903 establishments in Switzerland